Kevin Li (born 11 July 1986) is a Canadian badminton player from the Lee's badminton club. In 2013, he won the silver medal at the Pan Am Championships in the men's doubles event partnered with Nyl Yakura, they were defeated by their compatriots Adrian Liu and Derrick Ng in the finals round. In the team event he won the gold medal.

Achievements

Pan Am Championships
Men's doubles

Mixed doubles

BWF International Challenge/Series
Men's doubles

Mixed doubles

 BWF International Challenge tournament
 BWF International Series tournament
 BWF Future Series tournament

References

External links 
 

Living people
1986 births
Hong Kong people
Canadian male badminton players